Sergey Nikolayevich Pilipovich (born January 6, 1976, in Motol) is a Belarusian agronomist. Chairman of the Motal Selsoviet. Graduated Agronomy Department at the Belarusian State Agricultural Academy in Gorki.

References

External links 
 Изюминка Полесья – Мотольский сельсовет 

Living people
People from Motal
Belarusian agronomists
1976 births